For the Summer Olympics, there are four venues starting with the letter 'Q' and 29 venues starting with the letter 'R'.

Q

R

References

 List Q-R